The 1999 Polish Figure Skating Championships were competition of 1998–99 season.

Senior results

Men

Ladies

Pairs

Ice dancing

External links
 Archive results

Polish Figure Skating Championships
1998 in figure skating
Polish Figure Skating Championships, 1999
Polish Figure Skating Championships, 1999